Zaqatala International Airport  is an airport serving Zaqatala city in Azerbaijan. The latest reconstruction of the airport terminal and the runway was completed in 2008, after which the airport received an international status. It is located at the southern foot of the Main Caucasus range.

Airlines and destinations
Currently, Zaqatala Airport does not have any scheduled passenger operations.

See also
 Transport in Azerbaijan
 List of airports in Azerbaijan

References

Airports in Azerbaijan